Inaya Day (born Inaya Davis, January 17, 1977) is an American singer, best known for her vocal work on house music tracks such as "Horny '98" by Mousse T, and her cover version of "Nasty Girl" by Prince protégées Vanity 6.

Biography

Early career
Day started singing in church in Brooklyn, New York. She attended the prestigious High School of Music and the Performing Arts, and went on to study musical theater at the University of Bridgeport. She also appeared on Broadway, notably as understudy to Stephanie Mills as "Dorothy" in The Wiz, and stepped into the lead role in Washington, D.C. and St. Louis, Missouri.

She has had extensive experience as a session musician, having appeared on tracks by Michael Jackson, Al Green, Puff Daddy, MC Lyte, Queen Latifah, Monie Love, Big Daddy Kane and Jonathan Butler. Day has also written songs for Randy Crawford and Bootsy Collins, and has writing credits on Missy Elliott's"Gossip Folks" (the second single from her Under Construction album), on which Day co-wrote the hook and provided backing vocals.

House music

Day was introduced to house music in 1996 when she was asked to do a demo. She met German record producers Boris Dlugosch and Mousse T, who produced a dance single "Keep Pushin", which went on to reach No. 2 on the Billboard dance charts. She then sang chorus for Mousse T's track "Horny", which later gained in popularity when additional vocals from the duo Hot 'N' Juicy were added to the song. "Horny" reached No. 1 on the Billboard dance chart. The follow-up song "Hold Your Head Up High", with Booom!, reached No. 6 on the Billboard dance chart.

In 1997, she released the club anthem "Movin' Up", credited as DJ Mike Cruz Presents Inaya Day and Chyna Ro. For this record, long time friend and actress Tichina Arnold lent her vocals but chose to use the moniker Chyna Ro for the project. She again teamed up with Cruz for "Can't Stop Dancing" which reached No. 1 on the Billboard club play chart.

In 2004 she sang on a track by the Australian dance producer mrTimothy called "I Am Tha 1", credited to Mr Timothy featuring Inaya Day, which went to the top of the Australian dance charts and top 30 in the Australian pop charts. She also sang on his next single "Stand By Me" later that year. "Nasty Girl" was first released in Australia, reaching the top 20, and it was then released in the UK in July 2005, and reached No. 9 there. Later that year, she also guest featured on "The Glamorous Life", a single by T-Funk, an alternate alias of mrTimothy.  In June 2007, Day released a cover version of the 1988 Big Pig song, "Breakaway", which itself was a cover of the song "I Can't Break Away" by Chuck Jackson.

Family life
Day is also the cousin of Solomon Roberts Jr., the bandleader and co-founder of the Dance/funk group Skyy, for which she has confirmed as she is serving as a contributor as part of a profile on the group in an Unsung episode that will in March 2020.

Discography
1996 – "Can't Stop Dancin'" – Cruz and Bugz – No. 1 Billboard dance chart
1997 – "Movin' Up (Take My Problems to the Dance Floor)" – Mike Cruz featuring Inaya Day and Tichina Arnold China Ro  – No. 2 Billboard dance chart
2000 – "Feel It" – with DJ Dome – UK No. 51
"I'm Touched" – DJ Dove featuring Inaya Day
"Shout It Out" – Inaya Day meets Louis Benedetti
1999 – "Just Can't Get Enough" – Harry "Choo Choo" Romero Presents Inaya Day – No. 39 UK
"I Will" – Mongobonix featuring Inaya Day
"Hold Your Head Up High" – Boris Dlugosch Presents Booom!
"Keep Pushin' On" – Boris Dlugosch remix
2004 – "Better Things" – Afropeans
2004 – "I Am tha 1" – Mr Timothy featuring Inaya Day
2004 – "Nasty Girl" – produced by Mousse T. and So Phat! (cover of the Vanity 6 song)
2006 – "Stand By Me" – Mr Timothy featuring Inaya Day
2007 – "The Glamorous Life" – by T-Funk featuring Inaya Day
2007 – "Breakaway"
2008 – "Say You Will"
2008 – "Natural High" – Michael Woods Feat. Inaya Day
2009 – "Take Me Up" – Inaya Day vs. Leggz & Femi B
2009 – "Got 2 Get Up" – Mr Timothy featuring Inaya Day
2009 – "Let There Be" – Inaya Day and Antoine Dessante
2010 – "Superstar" – Inaya Day and DJ Eako
2010 – "Never Had Another Love" – Mike Cruz presents Inaya Day
2010 – "Better Days" – Inaya Day and Native Sons
2010 – "All I'm Sayin' (Just Hold On)'" – Inaya Day and Nick J
2010 – "Joy" – Inaya Day and Antoine Dessante
2010 – "Til The Morning Comes" – Inaya Day vs Diego Ray & Nick Corline
2010 – "Do The Right Thing" – Quentin Harris and Inaya Day
2011 – "Chase me" – Inaya Day
2011 – "Rapid Fire (Rapido)" – Inaya Day & Giangi
2011 – "Where Are They Now" – Inaya Day & Dmitry Filatov
2011 – "Sweet Lover" – Inaya Day vs Menini & Viani
2011 – "Next To You" – Inaya Day
2011 – "Time Is Now" – Inaya Day and Mangesto
2011 – "Lose My Worries" – Inaya Day & Ralf Gum
2011 – "My Love" – Inaya Day vs Sem Thomasson & Siege
2011 – "One Way" – Inaya Day
2012 – "That Place" – Dunk N' Aliens feat Mia & Inaya Day
2012 – "Redemption" – DeVonde & Mangesto feat Inaya Day
2012 – "Jump Up & Down" – Mike Cruz produces Inaya Day & Mark Shine
2012 – "Long Day" – Inaya Day Allstars featuring Crystal Waters
2013 – "Like You" – Ridney & Inaya Day
2013 – "Make Some Noise" – Inaya Day & DJ Escape
2014 – "Shelter Me" – Lee Dagger, featuring Inaya Day
2015 – "Stranded" – Dirty Disco, featuring Inaya Day
2016 – "Do What We Do" – Bit Error & Country Club Martini Crew feat. Inaya Day
2016 – "Keep Pushin'" – Tujamo, featuring Inaya Day
2016 – "One Night In Heaven" – Toy Armada and DJ Grind feat. Inaya Day
2020 – "Love Like This" – (Greg Gould feat. Inaya Day) on the album 1998

See also
List of number-one dance hits (United States)
List of artists who reached number one on the US Dance chart

References

External links
 Official Website
 T-Best Talent Agency

1977 births
Living people
American dance musicians
American house musicians
University of Bridgeport alumni
American contemporary R&B singers
American women in electronic music
21st-century American women singers
21st-century American singers
20th-century American singers
20th-century American women singers
20th-century African-American women singers
21st-century African-American women singers